The Mahindra Maxximo is a mini truck and a microvan that was manufactured by the Indian automaker Mahindra & Mahindra. 

The mini truck version is offered in two variants: Plus and CNG.

On 16 October 2015, the Maxximo was replaced by an updated version, known as the Mahindra Supro.

Specifications 

Engine capacity	909 cc
Power 	                26 hp @ 3600 rpm
Max engine torque	5.5 kg⋅m @ 1800-2200 rpm
Fuel tank capacity	33 L
Clutch and transmission	Clutch	Single plate dry type
Gearbox	Manual 4+1
Steering	Power Steering with Rack & pinion
Suspension	
Front: MacPherson strut independent suspension
Rear: Leaf Spring 
Brakes	
Front	"Disc brake"
Rear	Drum Brakes
Wheels & Tyres	Tyres	165 R14  & 175 LT 8PR
Dimensions	
Wheelbase	1950 mm
Length	3800 mm
Width	1540&nbdp:mm
Height	1900 mm
Load body dimensions	2280 mm × 1540 mm × 330 mm
Weights	GVW	1815 kg
Payload	850 kg

References

Mahindra vehicles
Trucks of India